Erigeron salmonensis  is a rare North American species of flowering plant in the family Asteraceae known by the common name Salmon River fleabane. It has been found only in the Salmon River Canyon in central Idaho.

Erigeron salmonensis  grows on ledges and cracks in north-facing cliffs. It is a perennial herb up to 35 cm (14 inches) tall, forming a woody underground caudex. The inflorescence generally contains only 1-3 flower heads per stem. Each head contains 11–15 white ray florets surrounding many yellow disc florets.

References

salmonensis
Flora of Idaho
Plants described in 1989
Flora without expected TNC conservation status